Rodriguan Creole is a dialect of Mauritian Creole, a French-based creole language, spoken on the island of Rodrigues in the Indian Ocean. It is spoken by virtually all 40,000 inhabitants of the island. On Rodrigues, like in the rest of the republic of Mauritius, English is the administrative language and French is also widely spoken, even more commonly than English.

See also 

 Creole language
 Agalega creole
 Mauritian creole
 Chagossian creole

Rodrigues
Rodriguan culture
Languages of Mauritius
French-based pidgins and creoles
Mauritian Creole